Artline may refer to:

Artline (program), a GEM/4 program by CCP Development GmbH
Artline (marker), a permanent marker series, also a Marker brand by Shachihata
Artline Engineering, Russian racing car manufacturer

See also
 Art line (disambiguation)